Sir Archibald Hope, Lord Rankeillor (1639 – 10 October 1706) was a Scottish advocate and judge, the second son of John Hope, Lord Craighall, the grandfather of the botanist John Hope and the great-grandfather of the chemist Thomas Charles Hope, FRSE.

Early life
Archibald Hope was the second son of Sir John Hope, Lord Craighall, 2nd Baronet Hope of Craighall and Margaret Murray, daughter of Sir Archibald Murray of Blackbarony.  He was the grandson of Sir Thomas Hope, 1st Baronet Hope of Craighall.

Legal career
Like his father and grandfather before him, Archibald Hope pursued a law career.  He was admitted an advocate on 30 June 1664 and readmitted on 8 January 1676.  He became a Lord of Session, assuming the name of Lord Rankeillor, on 1 November 1689, followed by Lord of Justiciary on 27 January 1690.  A knighthood by King William followed shortly thereafter.

Family
Sir Archibald Hope had the following children:
John, died unmarried, predeceasing his father
Sir Thomas Hope, 8th Baronet, Hope of Craighall, succeeded in 1766 upon the death of Sir John Bruce-Hope, the 7th Baronet.
Charles of Edinburgh married the eldest daughter of Thomas Boyd 
David, died unmarried
Robert was a surgeon and was the father of the botanist, John Hope, grandfather of the chemist, Charles Thomas Hope, FRSE.
Margaret, married Patrick Scott of Rossie, whose descendants include David Scott of Dunninald
Bethia, married firstly Ninian Lewis or Lowis, secondly Sir William Nairne, 2nd Baronet Nairne of Dunsinane
Ann, married Alexander Stevenson, W.S. of Montgreenan

Helen, married Patrick Butter, Esq. of Gormack

See also
Clan Hope
Hope Baronets of Craighall

References 

1639 births
1706 deaths
Archibald
Members of the Faculty of Advocates
Younger sons of baronets
People from Perthshire